Nat Knowles (born 29 October 1948) is a Bahamian boxer. He competed in the men's middleweight event at the 1972 Summer Olympics. Knowles won a silver medal at the 1974 Central American and Caribbean Games.

References

1948 births
Living people
Middleweight boxers
Bahamian male boxers
Olympic boxers of the Bahamas
Boxers at the 1972 Summer Olympics
Competitors at the 1974 Central American and Caribbean Games
Central American and Caribbean Games silver medalists for the Bahamas
Place of birth missing (living people)
Central American and Caribbean Games medalists in boxing